WSSC may refer to:

 Washington Suburban Sanitary Commission, the water and sewer system operator for the Maryland suburbs of Washington, DC
 Western Slope Safety Council, a Colorado occupational safety, health, and environmental organization for the oil and gas industry
 Winston-Salem State Teachers College, former name of Winston-Salem State University, a research university in Winston-Salem, North Carolina
  Wodonga Senior Secondary College in Victoria, Australia
 ISU World Synchronized Skating Championships
 WSSC (AM), a Christian radio station in Sumter, South Carolina